Dioryctria erythropasa is a species of snout moth in the genus Dioryctria. It was described by Harrison Gray Dyar Jr. in 1914 and is found from Arizona south along the Mexican Pacific coast to Central America.

The wingspan is 23–32 mm. The forewing ground color is variable, but generally with white maculations on a background of reddish brown and often heavily shaded with gray. The hindwings vary from light brown to light gray brown. There are two to three generations per year.

The larvae feed on Pinus chiapensis, Pinus douglasiana, Pinus lawsonii, Pinus leiophylla, Pinus maximartinezii, Pinus maximinoi, Pinus michoacana and Pinus oocarpa. They feed inside the conelets and cones. Feeding causes clumps of resin mixed with frass to accumulate on the cone surface. The larval gallery is irregular and goes through the cone axis, seeds and scales. Sometimes the larvae feed on seeds, construct a more or less spiral gallery and do not bore the axis. The larvae have also been recorded feeding in the cankers caused by Cronartium conigenum. Here, they make irregular galleries, pushing out frass that accumulates with silk and resin on the surface of the canker. Young larvae are brown, while mature larvae are bright green with small but obvious dark spots.

References

Moths described in 1914
erythropasa